Otto Albert Blehr (17 February 1847 – 13 July 1927) was a Norwegian attorney and newspaper editor. He served as a politician representing the Liberal Party. He was the 8th prime minister of Norway from 1902 to 1903 during the Union between Sweden and Norway and from 1921 to 1923 following the Dissolution of the union between Norway and Sweden.

Biography
Blehr grew up at a farm at Stange in Hedmark, Norway. His parents were Albert Blehr (1805–1872) and Maren Wilhelmine Ludovica Kathinka Stenersen (1818–1877).
His father was a doctor and physicist at Sanderud Hospital.

He graduated in 1865 and then began studying the University of Christiania. Blehr graduated cand.jur. in 1871. He served as parliamentary reporter for the newspapers Dagbladet and Bergens Tidende.  In 1874, he was one of the founders of the Fjordabladet where he served as the first editor-in-chief until 1882.  In 1878, he also started and served as the first editor of the Sogns Tidende.  Blehr was the governor of Nordre Bergenhus (1883–1888) and for Nordland (1895–1900).

In 1877, he established himself as a prosecutor at Lærdal in Sogn. In 1879 Blehr was elected as first deputy representative to the Storting for Nordre Bergenhus amt (now Sogn og Fjordane)  and from 1883 to 1888 he was a permanent representative. In the fall of 1888 he was not re-elected to the Storting. 
He  became a prosecutor (fogd) in Sunnfjord and Nordfjord. In 1889 a lawyer in Hålogaland. He held this assignment until he became a  judge  (lagmann) at Kristiania in 1893. In 1894 Blehr was again elected to the Storting, now for Nordland. Blehr was re-elected as parliamentary deputy for Nordland in 1898. On 21 April 1902, he took over as Prime Minister of the Norwegian government in Kristiania.

In October 1903, Blehr  resigned as a result of an election defeat.  In 1905 he was appointed as County Governor (stiftsamtmann) at Christiania (now Oslo), an office he held until 1921. On 21 June 1921,  Otto Blehr became Prime Minister  and at the same time also chief of the Ministry of Finance. He was also a member of the Norwegian delegation to the League of Nations 1920 and 1922–1925. On 3 March 1923 the government resigned.

Personal life
He married women's rights activist Randi Blehr (1851–1928) in 1876. Both were co-founders of the Norwegian Association for Women's Rights, where his wife later became President. Otto Blehr was awarded the Grand Cross of the Order of St. Olav in 1898. He was also the auditor of the Norwegian Nobel Committee from 1903 to his death in Oslo during 1927. He was the father of Eivind Blehr, a minister in the Quisling regime in World War II.

References

1847 births
1927 deaths
People from Stange
University of Oslo alumni
Norwegian jurists
Norwegian newspaper people
Norwegian newspaper editors
County governors of Norway
Government ministers of Norway
Liberal Party (Norway) politicians
Ministers of Finance of Norway
Prime Ministers of Norway
Recipients of the St. Olav's Medal
Burials at the Cemetery of Our Saviour
Norwegian Association for Women's Rights people
Ministers of Justice of Norway
Ministers of Trade and Shipping of Norway